This is a list of diplomatic missions in North Korea.

Embassies

The following countries have embassies in Pyongyang:

Most embassies are located in a special area of the city, known as the Munsu-dong Diplomatic Compound(문수동 외교단지 or 외국공관단지). The Russian, Chinese and the currently closed Pakistani embassies are located outside the diplomatic compound, as they are much larger than the other embassies.

The former East German embassy is the center of activity in the diplomatic quarter, as it houses the British, German, and Swedish embassies. Sweden acts as the protecting power for Australia, Canada, and the United States, provides consular services for the Nordic countries, and handles visa applications for Italy and Spain. EU countries Romania and Sweden provide consular assistance for all EU countries The British embassy provides consular assistance to any Commonwealth citizen whose country is not represented in North Korea, except for those whose governments have opted out of this arrangement.

Consulates general
Chongjin

Former embassies and offices
Kaesong
 (Inter-Korean Liaison Office) The Inter-Korean Liaison Office was destroyed by North Korea on June 16, 2020.
Pyongyang

Most embassies in Pyongyang have been closed due to severe COVID-19 restrictions and shortages of goods.

 (date unknown)

 

 (French Cooperation Bureau)

 (closed in 1999)

 

 (Swiss Cooperation Office)

Non-resident embassies
The following countries have non-resident embassies:

Resident in Beijing

Resident in Seoul

Resident in Tokyo

Resident in Hanoi

See also

 Foreign relations of North Korea
 List of diplomatic missions of North Korea
 Visa requirements for North Korean citizens

Notes

References

External links
Embassies in North Korea

List
Diplomatic missions
Korea, N
Diplomatic missions